The 1922 Green Bay Packers season was their fourth season overall and their second in the newly named National Football League. The team finished with a 4–3–3 record under player/coach Curly Lambeau earning them eighth place.

It was technically the franchise first season in the league, after they were removed because the team fielded college players in 1921 season. Green Bay representatives filed for a new franchise before the 1922 season under the name of the Green Bay Athletic club, and were registered in the league under the name Green Bay Blues. They returned to the original name a year later, as most teams around the league continued to call them the Packers.

Schedule

Standings

References

 Sportsencyclopedia.com

Green Bay Packers seasons
Green Bay Packers
Green Bay Packers